Agios Dimitrios–Alexandros Panagoulis, commonly known as Agios Dimitrios, and also known as Aghios Dimitrios on signage, is a station on line 2 of the Athens Metro. It served as the line's terminus from 5 June 2004, when it was inaugurated, until the extension to  opened on 26 July 2013. The station took its name from the municipality of Agios Dimitrios (Brahami), which is the area it serves, also the station has the name of Alexandros Panagoulis, a fighter against the dictatorial regime of 1967-1974 and later Member of Parliament, who was killed in a car crash at the point where the station is situated on 1 May 1976. The station is located beneath the Vouliagmenis Avenue. It is entirely underground and has a central island style platform, at the ends of which are the stairways, escalators & lifts up to the concourse level from which there are 4 exits to street level. The station is attached to Athens Metro Mall, one of Athens' major shopping centers.

In the initial plans to build the metro line 2 the station Agios Dimitrios / Alexandros Panagoulis was known by name "Ilioupoli", which came from the municipality of Ilioupoli, one of the areas which it serves. During construction of the Station it was decided to rename the station to "Alexandros Panagoulis". However shortly before the inauguration of the station it was decided to re-rename the station to its current name to appear more relevant to the municipality it serves.

References

Athens Metro stations
Railway stations opened in 2004
2004 establishments in Greece